Anna Gardner Goodwin (October 1874 – 1959) was an American composer, mainly of religious music and marches.

Early life
Anna Gardner was born in Augusta, Georgia, the daughter of Daniel and Anna Gardner. Dan Gardner was remembered as "the March King of Augusta", a cornet player who ran a Sunday afternoon concert series for black Augustans. "To dance and watch my father blow his cornet with such enthusiasm created within me a desire to make music," Anna Gardner Goodwin later wrote.

Career
Goodwin wrote and taught music for much of her adult life. She assisted her husband in playing and leading music at Morehouse College, and accompanying the school's glee club.  Her published compositions included "I Will Follow Jesus" (1906), "Do Not Touch the Wine Cup" (1906), "Jesus Don't Pass Me By" (1906), "Praise the Lord" (1906), "Tell the Story Everywhere" (1906), "Willing Workers" (1906), "Adalene" (1909), and "I'm Lonely Just for You" (1934). Her last composition, "Freedom to All March", was written to commemorate the 1951 race riot in Cicero, Illinois. Goodwin's "Cuba Libre March" (1898) was included in Black Women Composers: A Century of Piano Music, 1893-1990 (1992).

Goodwin was assistant house director of the Chicago YWCA in the 1930s.

Personal life and legacy
Anna Gardner married the Rev. George A. Goodwin, a professor of theology at Morehouse College, in 1895. They had a son, George Jr., and daughters Janie, Anna, and Eunice. She was widowed when George died in 1914. In widowhood she lived with her widowed sister Janie Gardner Burruss (1876-1924) in Chicago. Anna Gardner Goodwin died in 1959, aged 85 years. Her papers are archived at the Center for Black Music Research, Columbia College Chicago.

Her granddaughter Jane Alexander Robinson was one of the founders of the Michigan Association of Black Psychologists. Jane's sons David E. Robinson III and Richard Robinson both became professional musicians and composers. Anna Gardner Goodwin's great-grandson Richard Robinson became a full member of the Detroit Symphony Orchestra in 1989. In 2010, he was a Kresge Arts Fellow.

References

External links 

1874 births
1959 deaths
African-American composers
African-American women composers
American women composers
African-American women musicians
20th-century African-American people
20th-century African-American women